Francisco Calderón (born 2 March 1971) is a Colombian boxer. He competed in the men's welterweight event at the 2000 Summer Olympics.

References

External links
 

1971 births
Living people
Colombian male boxers
Olympic boxers of Colombia
Boxers at the 2000 Summer Olympics
Place of birth missing (living people)
Welterweight boxers